Robert Michael Manne  (born 31 October 1947) is an Emeritus Professor of politics and Vice-Chancellor's Fellow at La Trobe University, Melbourne, Australia. He is a leading Australian public intellectual.

Background
Robert Manne was born in Melbourne to parents who were Jewish refugees from Europe. His earliest political consciousness was shaped by this fact and that both sets of grandparents were victims of The Holocaust. He was educated at the University of Melbourne (1966–69) (BA) (Honours thesis 1969, "George Orwell: Socialist Pamphleteer") and the University of Oxford (BPhil). He joined La Trobe University in Melbourne in its early years. He served there as a professor in politics and culture until retirement in 2012. He is Vice-Chancellor's Fellow and Convenor of the Ideas & Society Program at La Trobe.

Since 1983, he has been married to journalist and social philosopher Anne Manne (née Robinson). He has two daughters, including Kate Manne, a philosopher and an associate professor at Cornell University.

Contributions
Manne's broad interests include 20th-century European politics (including the Holocaust), Communism, and Australian politics. He has undertaken research in areas such as censorship, anti-semitism, asylum seekers and mandatory detention, Australia's involvement in the Iraq War, the Stolen Generations, and the "history wars" of the 1990s.

Manne has aligned at various times within the Australian political scene from left to right, then back to left again; he titled a compendium of his political essays Left, Right, Left. Between 1989 and 1997 Manne edited the conservative magazine Quadrant, resigning when his editorial policies diverged from the views of the magazine's management committee. He had originally been appointed based on his previous anti-communist publications and his reputation as a conservative. Some people associated with Quadrant during his editorship believed that he was trying to push the magazine to the left. Since leaving the magazine, Manne has criticised it and the editors who came before—Peter Coleman and Roger Sandall, and after him—P. P. McGuinness and Keith Windschuttle.

In 1996 he published The Culture of Forgetting, which explored the controversy surrounding Helen Demidenko's 1994 Miles Franklin Award-winning novel about the Holocaust, The Hand that Signed the Paper. His book was widely discussed and cited. 

Among Manne's other books are The New Conservatism in Australia (1982), In Denial: The Stolen Generations and the Right (2001), and Do Not Disturb (2005). He edited the 2003 anthology, Whitewash: On Keith Windschuttle's Fabrication of Aboriginal History, as a rebuttal to Keith Windschuttle's claims disputing there was genocide against Indigenous Australians and guerrilla warfare against British settlement on the continent. Contributors included Henry A. Reynolds, who writes on frontier conflict; and Lyndall Ryan, whose book The Aboriginal Tasmanians is one of the main targets of Windschuttle's work.

Manne was Chairman of the editorial board of The Monthly, a national magazine of politics, society and the arts, from February 2006 until his resignation on 18 August 2011. He wanted to focus on his writing, "including a new blog to be published on The Monthlys website." Manne's departure as chairman resulted in the editorial board's dissolution, with Monthly editor Ben Naparstek announcing, "We're not going to have one any more." Manne's blog, entitled Left, Right, Left, had its first post on 12 September.

Manne is also Chair of the Australian Book Review, a board member of The Brisbane Institute, and a member of the board of the Stolen Generations Taskforce in Victoria.

Influences
Over the years, Manne has claimed a range of political, economic, philosophical, and academic figures as influences from across the political spectrum. These have included Primo Levi, Václav Havel, George Orwell, Richard Pipes, Sven Lindqvist, Friedrich Hayek, Eric Hobsbawm, Aleksandr Solzhenitsyn and Joseph Stiglitz.

Honours
 Fellow of the Academy of the Social Sciences in Australia (1999).
 In 2005 he was voted Australia's leading public intellectual in a survey conducted by The Sydney Morning Herald.
 Festschrift volume:   Tavan Gwenda (ed.). 2013. State of the Nation: Essays for Robert Manne. Melbourne: Black Inc.
 Shortlisted for the Melbourne Prize for Literature, 2012.
 API Top Australian Public Intellectuals (number 1)
 Officer of the Order of Australia, 2023 Australila Day Honours, for "distinguished service to tertiary education, to political and social commentary, to public affairs, and to the Indigenous community"

Bibliography

Books
 
 
 
 
 
 
 
 
 
 
 
 
 
 
 
 
 
 
 
 
 
 
 

Quarterly Essays
 QE01 In Denial: The Stolen Generations and the Right (2001) 
 QE13 Sending Them Home: Refugees and the New Politics of Indifference (2003)  – With David Corlett
 QE43 Bad News: Murdoch's Australian and the Shaping of the Nation (2011)

Essays and reporting

Quadrant editorials

Book reviews

References

External links
 Manne's profile at La Trobe University
 Articles by Manne at The Monthly
 Articles by Manne at The Guardian

1947 births
Living people
Australian political scientists
Academic staff of La Trobe University
Australian journalists
Australian people of Jewish descent
Alumni of the University of Oxford
University of Melbourne alumni
Quadrant (magazine) people
Officers of the Order of Australia